Passini is a surname. Notable people with the surname include:

Ludovico Passini (1832–1902), Austrian-Italian painter
Ludwig Passini (1832–1903), American painter and printmaker

See also
Massini
Passoni